Wall's vine snake (Ahaetulla isabellina) is a species of tree snake endemic to the southern Western Ghats of India.

Taxonomy 
It was formerly considered a subspecies of A. nasuta, which is now considered to only be endemic to Sri Lanka. A 2020 study found A. nasuta to be a species complex of A. nasuta sensu stricto as well as A. borealis, A. farnsworthi, A. isabellina, and A. malabarica, elevating A. isabellina to species. The specific epithet is a reference to the isabelline yellow coloration of the species' dorsal body in live condition, which distinguishes it from other species in the complex.

Geographic range 
This species is distributed in the southern Western Ghats in Tamil Nadu and Kerala south of the Palghat Gap, from the Anaimalai Hills south to kalakkad reserve forest area although more work is needed to determine the southern limit of the species' range.

Habitat 
This species is found in evergreen forests of the Western Ghats from ~550 m to 1475 msl.

References 

Ahaetulla
Reptiles of India
Snakes of Asia
Endemic fauna of the Western Ghats
Reptiles described in 1910